Warszawa Dome is an ice dome rising to 450 m in southwest King George Island, bounded by Ezcurra Inlet, Admiralty Bay, Bransfield Strait and Maxwell Bay. Named by the Polish Antarctic Expedition, 1980, after Warsaw, capital of Poland.

Ice caps of Antarctica
Poland and the Antarctic